The Saxophone Section (also issued as Coleman Hawkins Meets the Sax Section),  is an album by saxophonist Coleman Hawkins which was recorded in 1958 and released on the World Wide label.

Reception

Scott Yanow of AllMusic states, "the other saxophonists and part of the rhythm section were taken from the Count Basie Orchestra and outfitted with arrangements by Billy Ver Planck. They play a variety of little-known but swinging material; the logical charts and high-quality solos make this LP well worth acquiring".

Track listing
 "There Is Nothin' Like a Dame" (Richard Rodgers, Oscar Hammerstein II) – 3:51
 "Ooga Dooga" (Coleman Hawkins) – 5:46		
 "Thanks for the Misery" (Billy Ver Planck) – 4:19	
 "An Evening at Papa Joe's" (Frank Foster, Frank Wess) – 8:11	
 "I've Grown Accustomed to Her Face" (Frederick Loewe, Alan Jay Lerner) – 5:40
 "Thanks for the Misery" [alternate take] (Ver Planck) – 4:34 Additional track on reissue

Personnel
Coleman Hawkins – tenor saxophone
Marshall Royal, Frank Wess – alto saxophone
Frank Foster – tenor saxophone
Charlie Fowlkes – baritone saxophone
Nat Pierce – piano
Freddie Green – guitar
Eddie Jones – bass
Bobby Donaldson – drums
Billy Ver Planck – arranger

References

Coleman Hawkins albums
1958 albums
Savoy Records albums
Albums recorded at Van Gelder Studio
Albums produced by Ozzie Cadena